Isaac ben Jacob Alfasi (1013–1103)  - also known as the Alfasi or by his Hebrew acronym, the Rif (Rabbi Isaac al-Fasi), was a Maghrebi Talmudist and posek (decider in matters of halakha - Jewish law). He is best known for his work of halakha, the legal code Sefer Ha-halachot, considered the first fundamental work in halakhic literature.  His name "Alfasi" means "of Fez" in Arabic, but opinions differ as to whether he ever lived in Fez.

Biography
He was born in Qalaat Hammad, which is understood by most historians of the past 100 years to be Qalaat Beni Hammad in modern-day Algeria, capital city of the Hammadid rulers of central Maghreb. However, older sources believe Qalaat Hammad refers to a village near Fez. In the former case, Alfasi's name would indicate that his family had ancestry in Fez, an idea which is supported by the frequent reference to him as "ben Alfasi" or "ibn Alfasi" by the authorities closest to him in time and place. He studied in Kairouan, Tunisia under Rabbeinu Nissim ben Jacob, and Rabbeinu Chananel ben Chushiel the recognized rabbinical authorities of the age. Rabbeinu Chananel trained Alfasi to deduce and to clarify the Halakha from Talmudic sources, and Alfasi then conceived of the idea of compiling a comprehensive work that would present all of the practical conclusions of the Gemara in a clear, definitive manner. To achieve this goal, he worked for ten consecutive years in his father-in-law's attic.

In 1045, Alfasi moved to Fez with his wife and two children. (However, Binyamin Ze'ev Benedict and other recent scholars argue that Alfasi was never active in Fez.) Fez's Jewish community undertook to support him and his family so that he could work on his Sefer Ha-halachot undisturbed. They also founded a yeshiva in his honor, and many students throughout Morocco came to study under his guidance. The most famous of his many students is Rabbi Judah Halevi, author of the Kuzari; he also taught Rabbi Joseph ibn Migash (the Ri Migash), who was in turn a teacher of Rabbi Maimon, father and teacher of Maimonides (Rambam).

Alfasi remained in Fez for 40 years, during which time he completed his Sefer Ha-halachot. In 1088, aged seventy-five, two informers denounced him to the government upon some unknown charge. He left Fes for Al-Andalus, eventually becoming head of the yeshiva in Lucena in 1089.

His "magnanimous character" is illustrated by two incidents. When his opponent Rabbeinu Isaac Albalia died, Alfasi adopted Albalia's son. When Alfasi was himself on the point of death, he recommended as his successor in the Lucena rabbinate, not his own son, but his pupil Rabbi Joseph ibn Migash.

Sefer haHalachot
Sefer ha-Halachot (ספר ההלכות), also known as Hilchot haRif or Hilchot Rav Alfas (Hebrew: הלכות רב אלפס), was Alfasi's main work, written in Fez. It extracts all the pertinent legal decisions from the three Talmudic orders Moed, Nashim and Nezikin as well as the tractates of Berachot and Chulin - 24 tractates in all. Alfasi transcribed the Talmud's halakhic conclusions verbatim, without the surrounding deliberations; he also excludes all Aggadic (non-legal, homiletic) matter as well as discussion of the halakha practicable only in Land of Israel.

Generally the work follows the ordering of the Talmud, but sometimes Talmudic excerpts are moved from place to place, and very rarely non-Talmudic texts are incorporated into the work.

Impact
Maimonides wrote that Alfasi's work "has superseded all the geonic codes…for it contains all the decisions and laws which we need in our day…".

Sefer ha-Halachot plays a fundamental role in the development of Halakha. Firstly, "the Rif" succeeded in producing a Digest, which became the object of close study, and led in its turn to the great Codes of Maimonides and of Rabbi Joseph Karo. Secondly, it served as one of the "Three Pillars of Halakha", as an authority underpinning both the Arba'ah Turim and the Shulkhan Arukh. Rabbi Nissim of Gerona (the RaN) compiled a detailed and explicit commentary on this work; In yeshivot "the Rif and the RaN" are regularly studied as part of the daily Talmudic schedule.

This work was published prior to the times of Rashi and other commentaries, and resulted in a profound change in the study practices of the scholarly Jewish public in that it opened the world of the gemara to the public at large. It soon became known as the Talmud Katan ("Little Talmud"). At the close of the Middle Ages, when the Talmud was banned in Italy, Alfasi's code was exempted so that from the 16th to the 19th centuries his work was the primary subject of study of the Italian Jewish community. Alfasi also occupies an important place in the development of the Sephardi method of studying the Talmud. In contradistinction to the Ashkenazi approach, the Sephardim sought to simplify the Talmud and free it from casuistical detail; see for example Chananel Ben Chushiel.

Other works
Alfasi also left many responsa. These were originally written in Arabic, and were soon translated into Hebrew as "She'elot u-Teshuvot ha-Rif".

See also
 History of the Jews in Morocco
 History of the Jews in Tunisia
 History of the Jews in Kairouan

References

External links
English translation of some pages
The Rif, tzemachdovid.org
Alfasi, jewishvirtuallibrary.org
 jewishgates.com

Medieval Algerian Jews
1013 births
1103 deaths
11th-century Moroccan people
11th-century rabbis
Medieval Moroccan rabbis
12th-century rabbis in al-Andalus
Authors of books on Jewish law
11th-century rabbis in al-Andalus